Robert R. Lindgren is an American lawyer and educator, and the 15th president of Randolph-Macon College.

Education
Lindgren graduated Omicron Delta Kappa from the University of Florida in 1976. While he was in college he became a member of the Sigma Chi fraternity, and was awarded the Significant Sig Award in 2007. He appears on the list of notable alumni for the Sigma Chi Fraternity. Lindgren earned his J.D. degree from the Levin College of Law at UF in 1981 and his master's degree from Oxford University in 1978.

Career
Lindgren became interested in higher education administration after he started working in the office of University of Florida President Robert Marston.  In 1980, while Lindgren was still in law school, the director of University development, Bill Stone, asked Lindgren to organize a fundraising campaign of $1,500,000 for the building of another Levin School of Law building. Marshall Criser, the new president of the University, decided to replace Bill Stone with Lindgren as the Vice President for Development and Alumni Relations when Bill Stone left. With just four and a half years of experience, Lindgren was given the opportunity to head a prominent fundraising program at a major public university.

References

External links
Official Profile

 

Lindgren, Robert R.
Randolph–Macon College
University of Florida alumni
Living people
Year of birth missing (living people)
Fredric G. Levin College of Law alumni